The eleventh election for the governorship of Bangkok was held on 22 May 2022. It took place 9 years after the latest election in 2013, long delayed due to the 2014 coup d'état.

Chadchart Sittipunt, an independent candidate who was a member of the Pheu Thai Party, won the election in a landslide. He gained over 1.38 million votes, breaking the record set by Sukhumbhand Paribatra in 2013. Chadchart won an outright majority—over 1 million votes more than the second leading candidate, Suchatvee Suwansawat, who contested for the Democrat Party.

Background 
After the 2014 coup d'état, the National Council for Peace and Order (NCPO) became the military government in control of Thailand. It ordered all local elections to be halted, while the Governor of Bangkok, Sukhumbhand Paribatra, remained in his position. In 2016, Sukhumbhand was removed by the NCPO and replaced by Aswin Kwanmuang, the Deputy Governor of Bangkok at the time.

With the adoption of the 2017 constitution, the military government was disbanded following general elections held in 2019, though the charter made no provisions regarding the schedule of a return to elected local government. On 14 March 2022, the Election Commission of Thailand (ECT) announced that the Bangkok gubernatorial election will be held on 22 May 2022, occurring simultaneously with the Bangkok Metropolitan Council election and the local elections in Pattaya.

Candidates 
Over 31 candidates contested in this gubernatorial election. There are 25 and 6 male and female candidates respectively. The oldest candidate is 72 years old and the youngest is 43 years old.

Campaigning 

Chadchart Sittipunt, the former Minister of Transport during Yingluck Shinawatra's government, and Rosana Tositrakul, a former senator, have announced their plans to run for Governor of Bangkok since 2019. Other candidates gradually announced their candidacy starting from the last months of 2021. Like other elections in Thailand,  candidates campaign by visiting voters' houses, attaching campaign banners to utility poles or trees, and holding campaign rallies. Several debates were also held in the weeks leading up to the election.

Campaign positions 
Chadchart campaigned on a platform of improving lives of the grassroots population, the environment, the usage of new technology and the economy. Rosana campaigned on dredging canals to improve flood management and employing unemployed people do to so. She also campaigned to encourage the use of more solar panels, designating land for lower-income Bangkokians to do organic farming, and revising city planning and zoning regulations to lessen benefits given to major corporations. Suchatvee campaigned to create a welfare city, build underground flood reservoirs, build laboratory schools in every district, and propose for Bangkok to be the host city of the 2036 Summer Olympics. Wiroj campaigned on creating policies to divert more funds to individual communities, repurposing abandoned land into public parks, building public housing in city centres, and quashing bribery in the administration. Aswin Kwanmuang campaigned about flood-prevention measures, solving the issue of there not being enough designated green areas, connect different modes of public transport, and promised to continue the work he had previously done as the incumbent Governor of Bangkok. Sakoltee campaigned on using artificial intelligence to solve traffic congestion, create new public transport routes for minor roads, using electric buses, and improving public parks. Sita Tiwaree campaigned on using blockchain technology to improve the quality of administrative processes, improving the quality of BMA schools, encouraging the use of electric vehicles, and employing the use of bounty system to increase citizen participation in law enforcement.

Attempts to manipulate voters 
Almost all opinion polls showed that Chadchart was the leading candidate. As a result, many conservative or anti-Thaksin figures have attempted to manipulate voters and called for voters to vote strategically. Examples include Suthep Thaugsuban, former Deputy Prime Minister, who said that people should elect Sakoltee instead of Chadchart because the latter "received benefits from Thaksinocracy." Major General Nanthadech Mechsawasd, former head of the Special Operations branch of the Armed Force Security Center made a post on Facebook, calling for people who dislike Thaksin Shinawatra to elect Sakoltee and outvote Chadchart. In the last days before the election, Rosana used the same method, and said that people who are loyal to King Bhumibol's guidance would never vote for a corrupt person to be in public office.

A few days before election day, internet users alleged that they received a text message encouraging them to elect Suchatvee, the Democrat Party candidate. The Democrat Party's deputy spokesperson Darunwan Chanpipattanachai denied in an interview that the party was officially involved with the text messages being sent and did not know where they came from.

General Prayut Chan-o-cha visited Khlong Ong Ang which was seen as supporting Aswin's campaign for his second term, although an explicit endorsement wasn't made as there were legal limitations on the Prime Minister's part. Additionally, Aswin garnered the support of some Palang Pracharat councillor candidates, who helped him in his campaign.

Election Day 

On election day, there were special areas in polling booths designated for people who are infected with COVID-19. Temperature checks were performed and hand sanitisers were available. Pens taken from home were allowed for people taking extra precautions against being infected. Polling stations were open from 8 AM to 5 PM. In some spots, people queued up in front of polling stations before they were open such as Bang Sue Grand Station, where there were 8 polling stations.

During the election, Chairman of the Election Commission Ittiporn Boonprakong told the press that pens having colours other than blue are not allowed, and if found to be used on a ballot it will be considered spoilt. Meanwhile, Permanent Secretary to the BMA and Director of Bangkok Local Elections later clarified that pens of colours other than blue can be used as long as it can be clearly seen on the ballot. The conflict of information generated widespread criticism online.

Results

Result analysis by the media and various figures 
Election results show that Chadchart won with 1,386,769 votes, the highest in any Bangkok gubernatorial election. Workpoint Today analysed that Chadchart's landslide victory came from several factors, including that he ran as an independent, his policies during his tenure as Minister of Transportation which were sabotaged, a clear vision, his follower number on Facebook which was higher than any other candidate, and that he took two years to prepare for the election. Director of the Office of Innovations for Democracy, King Prajadhipok's Institute Satithorn Thananithichoti opined that people elected Chadchart because they didn't want to see massive change, only the effective administration of the capital such as collecting garbage on time or designating more green areas.

Anusorn Thamjai of the Pridi Banomyong International College, Thammasat University, proposed the idea that this election showed the far-right, anti-democracy groups were weakening in numbers and were not popular within the younger population. Progressive, liberal and pro-democracy ideas, however, are growing more popular. Thitinan Pongsuttirak said that this election is symbolic of the people's dissatisfaction with the government's failures and a country that has been under military rule for so long. Yutthaporn Issarachai analysed that this election will affect the upcoming general election as people are fed up with the current government, of which Thaksin Shinawatra has the same view. However, Thaksin added that Chadchart also received votes from Move Forward Party voters who were voting strategically in hopes of giving Chadchart a landslide.

Opinion polls

Preferred governor

Reaction 
Secretary of the Move Forward Party Chaithawat Tulathon revealed that Wiroj received 2-3 times less votes than had been projected, referencing numbers from the 2019 general election, speculating that Bangkokians are not in favour of the party's vision of what the Governor should do. Chaithawat said "This is a matter that we can think about later, but there are also people who say that the Move Forward Party is better off working in politics at a national level, but that is not the case. It is because there are people who are ready to elect Move Forward Party councillor candidates but not Wiroj for Governor of Bangkok because the voters expect another vision of who should be the governor, but they will certainly accept Wiroj working in national politics." An unnamed Democrat Party politician says that this election would test Democrat Party Leader Jurin Laksanawisit's theory of Prayut affecting the Democrat Party's electoral prospects. Jurin said in a press conference that the election result was satisfactory for the Democrat Party but Suchatvee's numbers were still lower than what the Democrat Party got in the 2019 general election.

Chadchart said "Today is a very meaningful day for me personally. 8 years ago I was involved in the coup. They put a bag over my head, my hands were tied and I was brought to a location which I did not know because they covered my head both when I was taken there and when I was taken out of there. I'm not angry, vengeful or hateful but rather I am forgiving of the situation that happened. However, it is a memory that constantly reminds me that when people start to have violent disagreements, get angry at one another, there will be a group of people who benefit from that. We can disagree on matters but not get angry at each other. Don't hate each other." Chadchart suggested civil servants in the administration to read policies he proposed on his campaign website. He said that if the civil servants did not listen to what the people want, then they would have a hard time doing their job. When asked if he can work with the government, Chadchart said that more people voted for him than the Prime Minister but he didn't say that to taunt him. He said that he can work with the government per rules and regulations.

Prime Minister Prayut Chan-o-cha said that the election was only for one province and couldn't accurately reflect his or his government's popularity nationwide.

References

Bangkok gubernatorial elections
2022 elections in Thailand
2022 in Thai politics
May 2022 events in Thailand